Sara Khoeniha (also Romanized as "Sara Khoeiniha"; born 1975 in Tehran) is an Iranian actress. She also acted by the name "Sara Vosoughi". She graduated from University of Tehran in the field Graphics.

Life
She is the ex-wife to "Changiz Vosoughi", and used the name "Sara Vosoughi" in her first two years of acting. In 1990, she had her first acting experience along with her husband in the film "Bloody Morning", and also 3 other movies still by the name "Sara Vosoughi". Her marriage lasted for two years.
A few years later, she once again started acting, this time by her own name, in the movie "Friends" directed by "Ali Shah Hatami".
She has been praised for her works and received awards.

Filmography
 2019: Gando
 2018: Mission Impossible 
 2015: Aspirin
 2011: Yeki az ma do nafar
 2010: Bidari-e Royaha
 2009: Superstar
 2008: Invitation 
 2006: Gis Borideh 
 2002: Masoomiyat Az Dast Rafte (TV series) 
 2000: Doostan 
 1992: Flowers and bullets (as Sara Vossoughi)

References

External links

1974 births
Living people
People from Tehran
Actresses from Tehran
Iranian film actresses
Iranian stage actresses
University of Tehran alumni
Iranian television actresses